Bravo Air Congo was an airline based in Kinshasa, Democratic Republic of the Congo operating domestic and regional passenger services. Its main base was N'djili Airport.

The airline was listed on the List of air carriers banned in the European Union.

Bravo Air Congo suspended operations on 8 August 2008.

History
Bravo Airlines was established in 2004 in Madrid, as a scheduled international and domestic passenger airline, registered in Spain. In 2006, wishing to expand their operations in the African market, Bravo Airlines became an airline group, and joined with several Congolese private investors, to create a new airline, named Bravo Air Congo. The new airline is registered in the Democratic Republic of Congo and began operations on 11 September 2006.

Destinations
Bravo Air Congo operated services to eight domestic destinations, including Gemena, Kalemie, Isiro and Lubumbashi, and eight cities in West Africa, as well as Johannesburg and Nairobi. Connections with its Spanish sister company, Bravo Airlines, link Brazzaville and Kinshasa with Brussels, Paris and Madrid.

The destinations of the Bravo Air Congo were (starting 11 September 2006) :

Domestic
 Goma
 Isiro
 Kananga
 Kinshasa
 Kisangani
 Lubumbashi
 Mbuji-Mayi
 Bukavu

International
 Bangui
 Brazzaville
 Brussels
 Johannesburg
 Lagos
 Madrid
 Nairobi
 Paris (Charles de Gaulle Airport)
 Pointe-Noire

Fleet
 1 – Boeing 767
 5 – Douglas DC-9

See also		
 Transport in the Democratic Republic of the Congo

References

External links

  via Wayback Machine

Defunct airlines of the Democratic Republic of the Congo
Airlines established in 2006
Airlines disestablished in 2007
Companies based in Kinshasa